Góra  is a town in Lower Silesian Voivodeship, in western Poland. It is the administrative seat both of Góra County and of the smaller district (gmina) called Gmina Góra.

Geography
As at 2019, it has a population of 11,797.

History

The settlement in the Duchy of Silesia of fragmented Poland was first mentioned as Gora in an 1155 deed by Pope Adrian IV conveying the property to the Diocese of Wrocław. The name of the town means "hill" or "mountain" in Old Polish. In 1256 the bishop of Wrocław Tomasz I gave the village to the Polish knight Gosław. In 1288 it became part of the Duchy of Głogów and was granted Magdeburg town rights by the Piast duke Henry III. In 1300, Henry III sold the local mint to the city council of Góra. Henry III, as well as the succeeding dukes Henry IV the Faithful and Konrad I granted new privileges to the town in 1306 and 1310. From the 14th century onwards, the town developed to a centre of cloth manufacturing, specific privileges were granted to the clothiers of Góra in 1304. The Germanized name Guhrau is first documented in 1336. In 1343, an annual fair was established. Also from that year comes the first mention of the existence of a parish school in Góra. The town remained under the rule of the Polish houses of Piast and Jagiellon as part of the duchies of Głogów, Ścinawa and Cieszyn. until the 16th century.

The town, as Guhrau, was annexed by Prussia upon the First Silesian War in 1742 and from 1816 was the administrative seat of Landkreis Guhrau within the Province of Silesia, which from 1871 to 1945 was also part of Germany. In World War II it was occupied by the Red Army during the 1945 Vistula–Oder Offensive. According to the Potsdam Agreement, the town passed to the People's Republic of Poland, while the remaining German population was expelled. The historic name Góra was restored and the town was repopulated by Poles, expelled from former eastern Poland annexed by the Soviet Union. Again a county seat from 1946, from 1975 to 1998 Góra belonged to Leszno Voivodeship. In 1999 Góra's town limits were expanded by including the settlement of Sędziwojowice as its eastern district.

Notable people
 Benno Erdmann (1851–1921), German philosopher
 Augustin Rösler (1851–1922), German theologian
 Wilhelm Klemm (1896–1985), German scientist
 Werner Naumann (1909–1982), German Nazi Secretary of State
 Paweł Tuchlin (1946-1987), Polish serial killer known as “Scorpion”
 Izabella Sierakowska (1946–2021), Polish politician
 Radosław Kałużny (born 1974), Polish football player

Twin towns – sister cities
See twin towns of Gmina Góra.

References

External links

 
 Jewish Community in Góra on Virtual Shtetl
 Guhrau Gora Pictures
 Góra Pictures 

Cities and towns in Lower Silesian Voivodeship
Góra County
Cities in Silesia